Members of the New South Wales Legislative Assembly who served in the fourth parliament of New South Wales held their seats from 1860 to 1864: The Speaker was Terence Murray until 13 October 1862 and then John Hay.

See also
First Robertson ministry
Third Cowper ministry
First Martin ministry
Results of the 1860 New South Wales colonial election
Candidates of the 1860 New South Wales colonial election

Notes
There was no party system in New South Wales politics until 1887. Under the constitution, ministers were required to resign to recontest their seats in a by-election when appointed. These by-elections are only noted when the minister was defeated; in general, he was elected unopposed.

References

Members of New South Wales parliaments by term
19th-century Australian politicians